Eagle Bend is a census-designated place and unincorporated community in Warren County, Mississippi. It is approximately 15 miles northwest of downtown Vicksburg, and is part of the Vicksburg Micropolitan Statistical Area. 

Eagle Bend began as a postal hamlet located directly on the Mississippi River.  In 1866, the river changed its course and created a natural cutoff called "Terrapin Neck".  The former bend in the river soon silted up at either end, creating Eagle Lake, an oxbow lake.

The population of Eagle Bend was 50 in 1900. It was first named as a CDP in the 2020 Census which listed a population of 296.

Eagle Bend is situated on the east shore of Eagle Lake, and is popular for fishing and water sports.

Demographics

2020 census

Note: the US Census treats Hispanic/Latino as an ethnic category. This table excludes Latinos from the racial categories and assigns them to a separate category. Hispanics/Latinos can be of any race.

References

Unincorporated communities in Mississippi
Unincorporated communities in Warren County, Mississippi
Census-designated places in Warren County, Mississippi